May Day is the second solo album released by The Get Up Kids lead singer Matt Pryor. Released in early 2012, the album was funded entirely through the crowdfunding website Kickstarter.

Recording
In early 2011, after a world tour with The Get Up Kids supporting their album There Are Rules, lead singer Matt Pryor decided to write and record a second solo album to follow up 2008's Confidence Man. Since the release of his first record, Pryor's longstanding relationship with Vagrant Records had come to an end, and he decided to release the album independently.

On May 2, 2011 Pryor launched a Kickstarter campaign to fund the production and release of the album, entitled "May Day." Pryor wrote and recorded the album on his own in his home studio concurrently with the month-long campaign. Much like the last Get Up Kids album, May Day was recorded entirely on analog equipment. The funding campaign launched with a goal of raising $10,000 to fund the entire release of the album, but ended up raising more than double that by the end of the campaign.

Release

May Day was released first to Kickstarter backers in late 2011, and released wide on January 24, 2012. The album was released on compact disc, 12-inch vinyl and digital download.

Track listing

References

2012 albums
Matt Pryor (musician) albums
Kickstarter-funded albums
Self-released albums